François René Jean Lucien Bayrou (born 25 May 1951) is a French politician who has presided over the Democratic Movement (MoDem) since he founded it in 2007. A centrist, he was a candidate in the 2002, 2007 and 2012 presidential elections. He has also presided over the European Democratic Party (EDP) since 2004.

From 1993 to 1997, he was Minister of National Education in three successive governments. He was also a member of the National Assembly for a seat in Pyrénées-Atlantiques from 1986 to 2012 with brief interruptions and a Member of the European Parliament (MEP) from 1999 to 2002. He has been Mayor of Pau since 2014.

It was speculated that Bayrou would be a candidate in the 2017 presidential election, but he decided not to run and instead supported Emmanuel Macron, who – after winning the election – named him Minister of State and Minister of Justice in the government headed by Édouard Philippe. On 21 June 2017, he resigned from the government amid an investigation into the MoDem's allegedly fraudulent employment of parliamentary assistants, initiated earlier that month.

Early life
Bayrou was born on 25 May 1951 in Bordères, Pyrénées-Atlantiques, a village located between Pau and Lourdes. He is the son of farmer Calixte Bayrou (1909–1974), MRP mayor of Bordères from 1947 to 1953, and Emma Sarthou (1918–2009). Bayrou descends from an ancestry of primarily Occitans except from his maternal grandmother's side which is Irish.

When Bayrou was in his youth, he developed a stutter which led to him attending speech therapy for seven years. He first went to secondary school in Pau, before transferring to Bordeaux. He studied literature at university, and at the age of 23, sat the "agrégation", the highest qualifying level for teachers in senior high schools and universities in France. Around the same time, his father was killed in a tractor accident.

Bayrou was married in 1971 to Élisabeth Perlant also known as "Babette". He and Perlant have five children, Hélène, Marie, Dominique, Calixte and Agnès. The children were raised on the farm where Bayrou was born and Bayrou currently lives there with Perlant.

Prior to embarking on his political career, Bayrou taught history in Béarn in the French Pyrenees. He is the author of several books on politics and history, including one on King Henry IV of France. Bayrou's hobby is raising horses. Although a practising Roman Catholic, he strongly supports France's system of laïcité.

Political career

First steps in politics: 1982–2002
In Bayrou's youth, he was active in nonviolent movements and followed Gandhi disciple, Lanza del Vasto.

Bayrou, a member of the Centre of Social Democrats (CDS), the Christian-democratic wing of the Union for French Democracy (UDF) confederation, was elected to the General Council of the Pyrénées-Atlantiques department in 1982 in the canton of Pau-Sud, then the French National Assembly four years later. After the victory of the RPR/UDF coalition in the 1993 legislative election, he became Education Minister in the cabinet led by Edouard Balladur. In this post, he proposed a reform allowing local authorities to subsidise private schools, which caused massive protests and was quashed by the Constitutional Council.

In 1989, after poor results in both the municipal elections and the European Parliament elections, Bayrou and twelve other centre-right parliamentarians including Philippe Séguin, Michel Noir, Alain Carignon, Étienne Pinte, Michel Barnier, François Fillon, Charles Millon, Dominique Baudis, François d'Aubert, Philippe de Villiers and Bernard Bosson demanded reform of the system at the RPR and the UDF, criticising the most prominent politicians of these parties including former president Valéry Giscard d'Estaing and Prime Minister Jacques Chirac. They called for the formation of a new right-wing party to unite the UDF and the RPR into a single entity. Ideological differences between members of this group led to members leaving, though d'Estaing endorsed Bayrou to become UDF general secretary in 1991.

Despite supporting Édouard Balladur's candidacy in the 1995 presidential election, Bayrou remained Education Minister following Jacques Chirac's election and the formation of a new government headed by Alain Juppé. Following the majority for the Plural Left in the 1997 legislative election, Bayrou returned to opposition and became president of the UDF in 1998, transforming it into a unified party rather than a union of smaller parties.

Positioning of the UDF as a centrist party: 2002–2007
In 2002 François Bayrou rejected proposals to merge the UDF with the Rally for the Republic (RPR), into a new entity that later became the Union for a Popular Movement (UMP). As a result, many UDF members left to join the UMP.

Bayrou was increasingly critical of the direction taken by the UMP-led government, which he described as out of touch with the average Frenchman. He denounced the de facto two-party system, in which the Socialist Party and the RPR (later UMP) alternate. Instead, Bayrou called for a pluralist system in which other parties would also contribute.

On 16 May 2006, Bayrou supported a motion of no confidence sponsored by Socialist deputies calling for the resignation of Prime Minister Dominique de Villepin's government following the Clearstream affair. As de Villepin's UMP had an absolute majority in the National Assembly, the motion failed. Following Bayrou's support for this measure, France's television authority classified him as a member of the parliamentary opposition for timing purposes. However, after Bayrou protested, he was classified as a member of neither the majority nor the opposition.

Second presidential campaign: 2007
Bayrou contested the presidency again in 2007. Most commentators had expected the election to be fought primarily between Sarkozy and Ségolène Royal of the Parti Socialiste. However, Bayrou's increasing support in polls in February complicated the "Sarko-Ségo" scenario, and led to speculation that the Parti Socialiste candidate would fail to progress to the second round for a second consecutive election, following the defeat of former Prime Minister Lionel Jospin in 2002 by National Front leader Jean Marie Le Pen. Ultimately, Bayrou finished in third place in the election with 18.57% of the vote (6,820,119 votes), behind Sarkozy and Royal, the best performance by the UDF in a Presidential election since 1981. Bayrou declared that he could not endorse either Sarkozy or Royal in the second round, although he indicated that Sarkozy was the worse of the two.

Foundation of the Democratic Movement: 2007–2012
After the 2007 election, Bayrou announced his intention to form a new centrist party, the Democratic Movement (MoDem). The majority of UDF politicians did not follow him, and instead formed a rival party, the New Centre, which pledged to support an alliance with the UMP. However, most of the UDF's grassroots membership remained with Bayrou and joined MoDem. In the subsequent legislative elections in June 2007, MoDem came third with 7.6% of the vote. Although an increase on the UDF share of the poll of 4.9% in the 2002 elections, MoDem won only four seats, including Bayrou's own seat. The other parliamentarians elected on the party's list were Jean Lasalle, Thierry Benoit (who has since left the party, to join the New Centre) and Abdoulatifou Aly. The establishment of MoDem led to the formal dismantling of the UDF alliance on 30 November.

Third presidential election: 2012 

On 18 August 2011, Bayrou released a book, 2012. Etat d'urgence, in which he discussed how and why the economic crisis happened, and outlined the top priorities of his next presidential program: production and education.

François Bayrou confirmed his candidacy for the 2012 presidential election on 25 November 2011, in an interview with journalist Laurence Ferrari on her show Parole Directe on TF1.

His supporters included:
 Jean Arthuis, president of the Centrist Alliance, president of the Senate Finance Committee (2002–2011)
 Bernard Bosson, Mayor of Annecy (1977–2007), member of the National Assembly of France for Haute-Savoie (1986–2007)
 Pierre Albertini, Mayor of Rouen
 Anne-Marie Idrac, Secretary of State for International Trade under Nicolas Sarkozy (2008–2010)
 Alain Lambert, Budget Minister (2002–2004)
 Daniel Garrigue, member of the National Assembly of France for Dordogne and former press secretary for Dominique de Villepin
 Jean-François Kahn, author and former director of the newspaper Marianne

Bayrou was eliminated in the first round, receiving around half of his vote share from 2007; he announced that he would be voting for Socialist François Hollande in the runoff.

2017 presidential election
On 22 February 2017, Bayrou announced that he would not contest the 2017 presidential election, instead endorsing the centrist candidate Emmanuel Macron of En Marche!. The alliance surprised French political pundits and rival candidates. Part of the agreement was Macron's commitment to support a clean government law proposed by Bayrou. Bayrou said that France was "at extreme risk", requiring an "exceptional response", adding that the alliance did not mean that MoDem would be subsumed by En Marche!

Minister of Justice (2017) 
On 17 May 2017, Bayrou was appointed as Minister of Justice in the first Philippe government.

Le Canard enchaîné published information that Democratic Movement politician Marielle de Sarnez had been paid for work she had not actually done, embroiling Bayrou in a fictitious jobs scandal. France Info later reported that MoDem had "over a dozen" fictitious jobs in the European Parliament.

Bayrou resigned several days before the 2017 legislative election, with Prime Minister Édouard Philippe announcing following the election that Bayrou would not be a part of the second Philippe government, only 35 days after he had taken the post.

Later career
In February 2022, Bayrou created what he calls a "sponsorship bank", joined by a few hundred local officials, willing to give their signatures to candidates for the presidential election struggling to obtain them, even if they represent a large part of the public according to opinion polls. Later that month, he announced that he was prepared to give his signature to help far-right candidate Marine Le Pen to stand in the presidential election.

Political views 

François Bayrou has been a vocal campaigner on a variety of issues, including reform of the political process, civil liberties, and free software (see DADVSI). During the 2007 presidential election campaign he described the European Union as "the most beautiful construction of all humanity". He called for France to play a greater role in the European Union's affairs, and supports the ratification of a European Constitution, in a more concise and readable form than the one voted down by the French electorate in 2005.

In an interview with The New York Times in 2007, Bayrou said: "I am a democrat, I am a Clintonian, I am a man of the 'third way'". He positioned himself as a centrist, although he has historic ties to the right. His platform emphasises job creation, improvement of educational standards, improved conditions in the troubled suburbs, reduced government spending, a balanced budget and a stronger European Union, with France as its de facto leader. He has also criticized China's protection of the Sudanese government from UN Security Council sanctions. Bayrou was highly critical of the American economic model under George Bush and of the unregulated free market in general. He described the United States economic model as a "survival of the fittest" system, where it was often stated that money was people's only motivation, where higher education was too expensive, and where the middle class was shrinking. Bayrou criticized the Iraq war, saying it was "the cause of chaos" in the region.

He criticized Nicolas Sarkozy's foreign policy, including the invitation of Libyan leader Muammar Gaddafi for a week-long state visit to France and the signing of military cooperation agreements with Libya.

In 2009, he criticized statements by Pope Benedict XVI claiming that condoms promote AIDS. Bayrou called the remarks "unacceptable," adding that "the primary responsibility, particularly of Christians, is the defence of life...This is a continent in which tens of millions of women and men are dying."

He called for France to boycott the 2008 Summer Olympics, due to the poor human rights record in China and political unrest in Tibet. During a rally in Paris on 21 March he said that "if this drama does not stop, France would do itself credit by not coming to the Olympic Games", criticising China's opposition to sanctions against Sudan over its involvement in the humanitarian crisis in Darfur.

Bayrou is fluent in Béarnese and often expresses his support for regionalism.

Governmental functions
Minister of National Education: 1993–1995.
Minister of National Education, Higher education and Research: 1995–1997.
Minister of Justice: 2017-2017
Electoral mandates

European Parliament
Member of European Parliament: 1999–2002 (Reelected member in the National Assembly of France in 2002)

National Assembly of France
Member of the National Assembly of France for the Pyrénées-Atlantiques' 2nd constituency: 1986–1993 (Became minister in 1993) / 1997–1999 (Became member of European Parliament in 1999) / 2002–2012. Elected in 1986, reelected in 1988, 1993, 1997, 2002, 2007. He lost his seat on 17 June 2012.

General Council
President of the General Council of Pyrénées-Atlantiques: 1992–2001. Reelected in 1994, 1998.
General councillor of Pyrénées-Atlantiques: 1982–2008. Reelected in 1988, 1994, 2001.

Municipal Council
Mayor of Pau: since April 2014.
Municipal councillor of Pau, Pyrénées-Atlantiques: 1983–1993 (Resignation) / Since 2008. Reelected in 1989, 2008, 2014.

Political functions
President of the Union for French Democracy: 1998–2007.
President of the European Democratic Party: since 2004.
President of the Democratic Movement: Since 2007.

References

Bibliography
Bayrou is the sole author unless other names are mentioned.

 , subject(s): Enseignement—Réforme—France—1970–, Éducation et État—France—1970–.
  le Grand livre du mois 1994, subject(s): Henri IV (roi de France ; 1553–1610) – Biographies, France—1589–1610 (Henri IV).
 
 , preface by François Bayrou.
 , le Grand livre du mois 1996, subject(s): Politique et éducation—France—1990–, France—Conditions sociales—1981–.
 
 , series: J'ai lu 4183.
 
 , preface by François Bayrou.
 
 
 , subject(s): Henri IV (roi de France ; 1553–1610 ) – Ouvrages pour la jeunesse.
 
 , le Grand livre du mois 1999.
 
 , series: Le livre de poche 14779.
 , "témoignages de François Bayrou et de Dominique Baudis", series: Politiques & chrétiens 16.
 , series: L'Info. Citoyenne.
 
 
 
 
 Abus de pouvoir, [Paris] Plon, 2009 
 2012, Etat d'urgence, [Paris] Plon, 2011

External links

  bayrou.fr – Campaign Website
  lesdemocrates.fr – Website of Bayrou's party
  france-democrate.fr –  Website on the Democratic Movement
  bayrou.fr – Video Channel on YouTube
  Video François Bayrou  (not linked to François Bayrou)
  François Bayrou Blog (not linked to François Bayrou)
  Site du Mouvement Democrate en Grande-Bretagne (Website of Bayrou's party in the UK and Ireland)
  Blog du Mouvement Democrate en Amerique du Nord – Etats-Unis et Canada (Website of Bayrou's party in North America)

|-

|-

|-

1951 births
Living people
Candidates in the 2002 French presidential election
Candidates in the 2007 French presidential election
Candidates in the 2012 French presidential election
Centre of Social Democrats politicians
Democratic Force (France) politicians
Union for French Democracy politicians
Democratic Movement (France) politicians
Deputies of the 8th National Assembly of the French Fifth Republic
Deputies of the 9th National Assembly of the French Fifth Republic
Deputies of the 10th National Assembly of the French Fifth Republic
Deputies of the 11th National Assembly of the French Fifth Republic
Deputies of the 12th National Assembly of the French Fifth Republic
Deputies of the 13th National Assembly of the French Fifth Republic
European Democratic Party
French Ministers of Justice
French Ministers of National Education
French Roman Catholics
Gandhians
Mayors of places in Nouvelle-Aquitaine
People from Pau, Pyrénées-Atlantiques
Politicians from Nouvelle-Aquitaine
State ministers of France
Departmental councillors (France)
Presidents of French departments